Club de Fútbol Alacranes de Durango, is a Mexican football club based in the city of Durango, Durango, Mexico and currently play in the second level of the professional Mexican football league system. Their colors are green, white with black trim, and their mascot is the scorpion.

History

Foundation

The need for a true professional sporting team, after the recent failures of basketball in the twilight of duranguense CIMEBA, prompted the state government to acquire through an application, the franchise of the now defunct Serpientes de Cancún (Cancun Serpents).

Once the league application was approved, Durango returned to professional football after an absence of eight years. During the Torneo Invierno 1997, Durango were as champions of the Zona Norte (North Region) and national runner-up after falling to Monarcas de Zitácuaro for an aggregate score of 3–1.

At the time, head coach Mario "Pichojos" Pérez who played in the 1970 FIFA World Cup, rethought the tactics and had another excellent season in the Torneo Verano 1998, before losing in the final of the Zona Norte (North Region) to Aguascalientes, who won the national final against Monarcas de Zitácuaro resulting in their promotion.

Mario "Pichojos" Pérez & José Vázquez Era
The Torneo Invierno 1998 and Verano 1999 of the Second Division of Mexican Football gave Durango great hope with a good tactical game and planning the perfect pair in Mario "Pichojos" Pérez and José Vázquez. Time and effort rewarded Alacranes de Durango, then under the name of (Camineros de Durango), reached the final on two occasions for the national championship to first beat Monarcas de Zitácuaro 1–0 in the Torneo Invierno 98 and then beat Potros Marte 4–3 in the Torneo Verano 99.

The starting XI that earned promotion for of was:

Joining the Primera A
Once Durango gained promotion into the Primera A, their name changed from Camineros de Durango to Alacranes de Durango. The departure of Mario "Pichojos" Pérez and José Vázquez was forced by the separation of the directors of the club.

In their first season in the Primera "A", Alacranes de Durango was led by Guillermo "Campeón" Hernández, a coach who performed well after accepting the role with the club in 20th place overall and leaving Durango in 18th place and in fourteenth in the percentage table.

Alacranes failed to qualify for the playoffs in both the Torneos Invierno 99 and Verano 2000 in the Primera División A. The state government decided to bring order to the professional sport and determined to avoid expenditures of professional basketball and professional baseball to devote their full support to José Velasco Najar and his board of directors, who came to replace the leaving group from the Torneo Invierno 2000. The reaction was swift, Velasco Najar, brought together valuable duranguenses, talented local entrepreneurs and ensured the best decisions on the sporting side.

The recruitment of figures such as a head coach Juan de Dios Castillo and his formidable coaching staff, players such as Gabriel García, a Mexican player with World Cup experience, champion of the Primera División de México, Luis Felipe Peña, whose prestige was formed as a defender for big teams like Club América itself, four young Brazilians who sought a place in Mexican football and an Argentine footballer would come to occupy the goal tending position in Durango, predicted success.

In May 2011 the team stopped participating in Liga de Ascenso (formerly Primera 'A') due to financial problems, however, the team continued to exist as the reserves that participated in the Liga de Nuevos Talentos became the main team.

Renaissance in Segunda División
The team began its new stage with a squad made up mainly of young players who had been trained at the club. In May 2013, the team won the Torneo Clausura, for which it won the right to play in the play-off for promotion to the Liga Premier de Ascenso (third level of Mexican soccer). In the series Durango was defeated by Académicos de Atlas, however, because Académicos did not have the right to promote from the category, its place was occupied by Durango.

On 18 December 2021, the team won the Torneo Apertura 2021 of Serie A after defeating Inter Playa del Carmen with a global score of 1-0, thus ensuring their place in the play-off for promotion to the Liga de Expansión MX, new second level.

After winning the third title in this division, the team managed to equal the Mexican record for most games in a row without losing at home, adding 29 games undefeated in the Estadio Francisco Zarco for which Durango tied the record for the clubs Pachuca and Tigres UANL. On April 1, 2022, the team surpassed the established mark and became the Mexican club with the longest time undefeated at home by adding 30 games without losing at home.

Promotion to Liga de Expansión MX
On May 15, 2022 Durango won the Serie A season championship after defeating Mazorqueros F.C., Torneo Clausura 2022 champion, with an aggregate score of 2–5. After the Serie A victory, the team was considered as a participant in the certification process to aspire to a place in the Liga de Expansión MX, finally, on June 14, 2022, the club's promotion to the second category of Mexican soccer was confirmed.

Honours
Segunda División de México Champions: 3
Invierno 1998, Verano 1999, Apertura 2021

Alacranes Durango "B"
Tercera División de México Champions: 1
Invierno 1999

Personnel

Coaching staff

Players

Current squad

References

External links
Official website
  Official club website

General fan sites
 Facebook Fan site

Football clubs in Durango
Liga Premier de México
Association football clubs established in 1958
1958 establishments in Mexico
Durango City